"Start It Up" is a song by American hip hop recording artist Lloyd Banks, released on November 2, 2010 as the third single from his third studio album H.F.M. 2 (The Hunger for More 2). The song, which features vocals from fellow American rappers Swizz Beatz, Kanye West, Ryan Leslie and Fabolous, was produced by American music producer Cardiak.

Background
The song originally leaked in the lead-up to the release of The Hunger for More 2, even though it was not released officially, the song still managed to gain airplay, resulting in the song charting on the Billboard Hot R&B/Hip-Hop Songs chart. It was unknown whether the song would be released as a single or not until he confirmed it in an interview on 102 Jamz.
Whilst speaking to MTV News, Banks' said this about the track,  In an interview with Rap-Up, Banks explained that Swizz Beatz was not originally on the chorus. At first it was thought that Kanye West had produced the track, but it was later confirmed that it was up and coming producer named Cardiak. A testament to the fast-paced music industry in 2010, Banks said, "The difference from that track being me and Fab and having Kanye was 24 hours."

Remixes
The official UK remix, featuring Swizz Beatz, Kanye West, Ryan Leslie, Sway DaSafo and Giggs, was released on December 3, 2010.
The official “Extended Version” was released on December 7, 2010. The extended version is the same as the original with the addition of a verse from fellow American rapper Pusha T.

The official remix keeps West's and Fabolous's verses, but adds a verse from Young Jeezy and a new verse from Lloyd Banks.

Music video
In an interview with DJ Whoo Kid on Sirius Radio, Banks confirmed that a music video would be filmed for the song, but a date had not been confirmed. It had been confirmed that Lloyd Banks was shooting his part for the video on November 12, 2010. Via Twitter it was confirmed that the G-Unit Riderz would make a cameo appearance in the video. However it is believed that because of the difficulty of getting the artists together at one time there may be no video.

Charts

Release history

References

2010 singles
Lloyd Banks songs
Swizz Beatz songs
Kanye West songs
Ryan Leslie songs
Fabolous songs
Songs written by Kanye West
Songs written by Swizz Beatz
Songs written by Ryan Leslie
2010 songs
Songs written by Cardiak